Cosimo Giorgio Schepis, known as Nuccio Schepis, (born April 23, 1955) is an Italian artist, sculptor, and art restorer. He took part in the Southern Italian Expressionist Movement called "I Mediterranei", which started in the 1980s.

He is also noted for playing a major role in the 2010-2011 restoration of the historic Riace bronzes.

Extended Readings
 Frangipane, Alfonso, and Mattia Preti. "Mostra - "I Mediterranei"" Istituto Istruzione Superiore "M. Preti - A. Frangipane" Istituto Istruzione Superiore "M. Preti - A. Frangipane", n.d.
 "Nuccio Schepis Respinge Al Mittente Le Polemiche Sul Presunto ‘abbandono’ Dei Bronzi Di Riace." Fame Di Sud. Ed. Aliamedia Società Cooperativa Editrice. Redazione, 5 Sept. 2013.
  Citta Di Novara. Città Di Novara, 02 Sept. 2013.
  "Stretto Di Messina: Alla Ricerca Del Ponte Che Non C'è." National Geographic. Gruppo Editoriale L'Espresso S.p.A., n.d.

1955 births
Conservator-restorers
Living people